Ahmed Khan (born 1 May 2004 in Swabi, Khyber Pakhtunkhwa) is a Pakistani cricketer who plays for Khyber Pakhtunkhwa. Khan made his List A debut for Khyber Pakhtunkhwa against Sindh on 8 March 2022 during the 2021–22 Pakistan Cup. He made his T20 debut for Sebastianites Cricket and Athletic Club against Tamil Union Cricket and Athletic Club on 23 May 2022 during the 2022 Major Clubs T20 Tournament. Khan played for the Pakistan national under-19 cricket team during the 2022 ICC Under-19 Cricket World Cup.

References

External links 
 
 Ahmed Khan at Pakistan Cricket Board

2004 births
Living people
Pakistani cricketers
Khyber Pakhtunkhwa cricketers
People from Swabi District